Lincoln Park is the largest urban park located in the Capitol Hill neighborhood of Washington, D.C. It was known historically as Lincoln Square.  From 1862 to 1865, it was the site of the largest hospital in Washington, DC: Lincoln Hospital.

Location
Situated one mile directly east of the United States Capitol, Lincoln Park is maintained by the National Park Service. The park is bounded by 11th Street NE and SE on the west, 13th Street NE and SE on the east, East Capitol Street NE on the North, and East Capitol Street SE on the south. It is four blocks northeast of Eastern Market.

The eastern end of the park includes two separate, enclosed play areas for young children. The grassy perimeter and central turf area are popular with neighborhood dogs and their owners.

History
Pierre Charles L'Enfant included the park in his original 1791 plan for the District of Columbia, intending it for public use (see: L'Enfant Plan). Though it was originally planned as the point from which all distances in North America would be measured (a zero milepost), it was not ultimately utilized for this purpose. Instead, the park was used as a dumping ground.

During the Civil War, it became the site where Lincoln Hospital was built to take care of the wounded Union Army soldiers. While there were many others around the city, it was the largest in the area built by the Army. It included 20 pavilions arranged in a V formation. 25 tent wards provided beds for 2,575 wounded. Covered pathways connected the kitchen and dining rooms.

The other buildings on site were:
 the headquarters (marked by the flag)
 the officers quarters
 the quarters for the Sisters providing the nursing care
 the barracks
 a guard house
 separate quarters for contraband
 service facilities: a water tank, laundry, barber shop, carpenter shop, stables and a morgue ("Dead House").

Like many of the other hospitals in the area, Lincoln Hospital was visited by family members as well as well wishers. One such visitor was Vinnie Ream, a talented mezzo-soprano (who later gained fame as Lincoln's sculptor). She  performed at the hospital in April 1864.

It was also visited by Walt Whitman, who was visiting injured soldiers in the local hospitals. He mentions it in his writings:

2,012 beds were occupied as of December 17, 1864.

As with most hospitals in the area, with the end of the Civil War in 1865, it was taken down that year. In 1867, Congress authorized the grounds to be called Lincoln Square as a memorial to the former president; it was the first public site to bear his name.

Statues
The park features two important sculptures:
 Thomas Ball's 1876  Freedman's Memorial to Abraham Lincoln (Emancipation Monument), one of the first memorials in Washington honoring Abraham Lincoln. It was dedicated on April 14, 1876, with an oration by Frederick Douglass. 
 Robert Berks's statue of Mary McLeod Bethune. It was unveiled on the anniversary of her 99th birthday, July 10, 1974, before a crowd of over 18,000 people. .

See also

 Washington, D.C., in the American Civil War
 Medicine in the American Civil War
 Armory Square Hospital
 Finley Hospital
 Harewood General Hospital
 Mount Pleasant General Hospital
 Abraham Lincoln
 Frederick Douglass

References

External links
"Lincoln Park" (National Park Service)

Lincoln Hospital
Military facilities in Washington, D.C.
Demolished buildings and structures in Washington, D.C.
Washington, D.C., in the American Civil War
Parks in Washington, D.C.
Urban public parks
Capitol Hill
Protected areas established in 1867
1867 establishments in Washington, D.C.